Rain Epler (born 6 June 1977) is an Estonian politician. He served as Minister of the Environment in the second cabinet of Prime Minister Jüri Ratas from 16 November 2020 to 26 January 2021. Tõnis Mölder was appointed as his successor. He is affiliated with the Conservative People's Party of Estonia (EKRE).

References 

1977 births
21st-century Estonian politicians
Conservative People's Party of Estonia politicians
Environment ministers of Estonia
Government ministers of Estonia
Living people
Members of the Riigikogu, 2023–2027
Politicians from Tallinn